Our Lady of the Annunciation Church or simply Church of Jabal Webdeh is a Catholic parish in Jabal al-Weibdeh in the city of Amman.

The parish is Roman (or Latin) rite, under the jurisdiction of the Latin Patriarchate of Jerusalem (Patriarcha Hierosolymitanus Latinorum). The parish celebrated its 50-year parish anniversary in 2012, and was restored for the occasion with funds from the Patriarchate. 

The Patriarchate was restored by Pope Pius IX in 1847 by the apostolic brief Nulla celebrior.

See also
Roman Catholicism in Jordan

References

Roman Catholic churches in Jordan
Roman Catholic churches completed in 1962
Churches in Amman
20th-century Roman Catholic church buildings